Szervánszky is a Hungarian surname, which refer to:
 Endre Szervánszky (1911–1977), a Hungarian composer
 Jenő Szervánszky (1906–2005), a Hungarian post-impressionist artist
 Péter Szervánszky (1913–1985), a Hungarian violinist
 Valéria Szervánszky (born 1947), a Hungarian pianist

Slavic-language surnames
Hungarian-language surnames
Hungarian families